Gaillac is a railway station in Gaillac, Occitanie, France. It is on the Brive–Toulouse (via Capdenac) railway line. The station is served by TER (local) services operated by SNCF.

Train services
The following services currently call at Gaillac:
local service (TER Occitanie) Toulouse–Albi–Rodez
local service (TER Occitanie) Toulouse–Figeac–Aurillac

References

Railway stations in Tarn (department)